Lyria grangei is a species of sea snail, a marine gastropod mollusk in the family Volutidae, the volutes.

Description

Distribution
Lyria grangei occurs in shallow waters of the Bellona Plateau of the Coral Sea. The type series was collected on a small submerged pinnacle in the southern sides of east South Bellona on sand at (Holotype, Paratype 1), in the peripheral reef slope of northwestern margins of western South Bellona at a depth of 17 meters (Paratype 2), and from the south side of the lagoon in western South Bellona (Paratype 3).

References

External links

Volutidae
Gastropods described in 1980